Manmohan Singh is an Indian film director and cinematographer. He is a director of Punjabi films and cinematographer of Bollywood films. In the past he had frequently collaborated with Yash Chopra and his son Aditya Chopra, for whom he shot Chandni (1989), Lamhe (1991), Darr (1993), Dilwale Dulhania Le Jayenge (1995), Dil To Pagal Hai (1997), and Mohabbatein (2000). Besides his Bollywood career as a cinematographer, he is also known as a pioneering director in Punjabi cinema. He directed his first Hindi film, Pehla Pehla Pyar in 1994 and first Punjabi film Jee Ayan Nu in 2003. He received "Lifetime Achievement Award" in PTC Punjabi Film Awards 2019.

Early life and career 

Singh's first big project was the debut film for Sunny Deol's Betaab. After that, he worked on many films like Lekin, Lamhe, Chaalbaaz in the early 1990s. He won two Filmfare Awards for Yash Chopra's Darr and Chandni. Manmohan Singh also sang for many Bollywood film songs like "Mere Pyar Ki Umar" from Waaris (1988) with Lata Mangeshkar, "Jeene De Yeh Duniya Chaahe Maar Daale" from Laava (1985) with Asha Bhonsle and "Marne Se Na Yun Darna" from Laila (1984) with Lata.

From the 2000s, Manmohan Singh started directing Punjabi films. His first Punjabi film was Jee Aayan Nu in 2003, and he consequently made films like Dil Apna Punjabi, Mera Pind and Munde U.K. De.

Filmography

Directed
 Nasibo (1993)
 Jee Aayan Nu (2002)
 Asa Nu Maan Watna Da (2004)
 Yaaran Naal Baharan (2005)
 Dil Apna Punjabi (2006)
 Mitti Wajaan Maardi (2007)
 Mera Pind (2008)
 Munde U.K. De (2009)
 Ik Kudi Punjab Di (2010)
 Ajj De Ranjhe (2012)
 Aa Gaye Munde U.K. De (2014)
 PR (2022)

Production
 Mera Pind (2008)
 Ik Kudi Punjab Di (2010)
 Honour Killing (2014)
 Hate Story 2 (2014)

Cinematography
 Chann Pardesi (Punjabi) (1981)
 Betaab (1983)
 Preeti (Punjabi) (1986)
 Ucha Dar Babe Nanak Da (Punjabi) (1987) 
 Vijay (1988)
 Waaris (1988)
 Souten Ki Beti (1989)
 Chandni (1989)
 Chaalbaaz (1989)
 Jeene Do (1990)
 Lekin... (1990)
 Sanam Bewafa (1991)
 Insaaf Ki Devi (1992)
 Yaad Rakhegi Duniya (1992)
 Apradhi (1992)
 Parampara (1993)
 Darr (1993)
 Nasibo (1994)
 Dushmani: A Violent Love Story (1995)
 Dilwale Dulhania Le Jayenge (1995)
 Maachis (1996)
 Aur Pyaar Ho Gaya (1997)
 Dil To Pagal Hai (1997)
 Jab Pyaar Kisise Hota Hai (1998)
 Hu Tu Tu (1999)
 Mohabbatein (2000)
 Albela (2001)
 Filhaal... (2002)
 Kash Aap Hamare Hote (2003)
 Woh Tera Naam Tha (2004)
 Sarhad Paar (2006)
 Ik Kudi Punjab Di (2010)

Awards 
 Filmfare Award for Best Cinematography:
 1990: Chandni
 1994: Darr
 1998: Zee Cine Award for Best Cinematography – Dil To Pagal Hai
 2001: Sansui Viewers Choice Award for Best Cinematography – Mohabbatein

References

External links 
 

Living people
Hindi film cinematographers
Punjabi-language film directors
Filmfare Awards winners
20th-century Indian film directors
Year of birth missing (living people)